Henry Thomas Sorrell (born June 10, 1943) is an American-born Canadian football player who played professionally for the Hamilton Tiger-Cats and BC Lions.

References

1943 births
Living people
Hamilton Tiger-Cats players